Concepción de Oriente is a municipality in the La Unión department of El Salvador.

The municipality borders the Goascorán River.
The river divides El Salvador and Honduras and serves as
the borderline in El Salvador's eastern part of the country.
The villa itself runs into the river.  There is no bridge connecting
the municipality to Honduras. The villa used to be known as "Saco".
There are paved roads that lead from the nearest big city of
Santa Rosa de Lima, La Unión.  The "fiestas patronales"
are in the first week of January.

Had the highest percent of remittances in El Salvador in 2005.

Migration and Development in El Salvador: Ideals Versus Reality

Municipalities of the La Unión Department